This list only contains passenger airlines that fly to more than 100 destinations.

References

Destinations
Lists of aviation organizations